Nicuşor Eşanu (born 12 December 1954) is a retired Romanian sprint canoer. He competed in the K-4 1000 m event at the 1976 and 1980 Olympics and placed fourth and second, respectively. At the world championships he won six medals with a gold (K-2 10000 m: 1979), three silvers (K-2 500 m: 1978, K-4 1000 m: 1978, K-4 10000 m: 1975), and two bronzes (K-2 10000 m: 1978, 1981).

Eşanu spent his entire career at CSA Steaua București, and after retiring from competitions worked as a coach there.

References

External links

1954 births
Canoeists at the 1976 Summer Olympics
Canoeists at the 1980 Summer Olympics
Living people
Romanian male canoeists
Olympic canoeists of Romania
Olympic silver medalists for Romania
Olympic medalists in canoeing
ICF Canoe Sprint World Championships medalists in kayak

Medalists at the 1980 Summer Olympics
20th-century Romanian people